Coquitlam Metro-Ford Soccer Club (CMFSC), formerly known as FC Xtreme and Tri-Cities Xtreme, are a Canadian men's and women's soccer club soccer team, founded in the city of Coquitlam, British Columbia in 2003. The team is a member of the Pacific Coast Soccer League.

The Xtreme play their home matches at Dr. Charles Best Secondary School, and previously played at Percy Perry Stadium; both facilities feature newly installed FieldTurf surfaces.

Since their founding, the Xtreme have been a dominant force in the PCSL, winning the Dave Fryatt Challenge Cup in 2003 (beating Surrey United), 2004 (beating the Victoria Stars) and 2007 (beating the Whitecaps FC Reserves).  They also finished runner-up in 2006, losing to the Whitecaps FC Reserves.

On 9 December 2008, the Coquitlam Metro-Ford Soccer Club acquired the Xtreme. This gave CMFSC franchise rights in the Pacific Coast Soccer League, which the club will use to enhance their men's program, including adding a PCSL Premier side in the future.

On 10 February 2009, the Xtreme announced that former Vancouver Whitecaps player Alex Barnetson will take over as head coach of the Premier squad, with Scott Fletcher stepping down as coach after two years, but remaining on as co-ordinator for Premier women's soccer. Meanwhile, CMFSC announced they will field two additional squads; the Xtreme's women's Reserve squad will be coached by former Xtreme player Kristine Jack, while the new U-21 men's team will be coached by another former Whitecap player, Canadian Soccer Hall of Fame inductee Garry Ayre.

References

External links
 Coquitlam Metro-Ford Soccer Club

Sport in Coquitlam
Women's soccer clubs in Canada
Soccer clubs in British Columbia